The Medici Vase is a monumental marble bell-shaped krater sculpted in Athens in the second half of the 1st century AD as a garden ornament for the Roman market.  It is now in the Uffizi Gallery in Florence.

Description
Standing 1.52 metres (approximately 5 feet) tall, with a gadrooned everted lip, it has a deep frieze carved with a mythological bas-relief that defies secure identification: a half-draped female figure Iphigenia seated below a statue of a goddess on a high plinth, restored as Diana, with heroic warriors on either side, perhaps Agamemnon and either Achilles or Odysseus standing to either side.  Two fluted loop handles rise from satyrs' heads on either side of the acanthus-leaf carved base, and it stands on a spreading gadrooned base on a low square plinth.

History
The vase reappeared in the 1598 inventory of the Villa Medici, Rome, but its origin is unknown.  Transferred from the villa in 1780, it has ever since been displayed in the Uffizi Gallery, today in the first-floor Verone sull’Arno overlooking the River Arno. It was often illustrated in engravings, the most famous of which is by Stefano della Bella (1656); he depicted the young Medici heir who would become Grand Duke Cosimo III seated, drawing the vase.

Often paired as garden ornaments since the later 17th century with the similar Borghese Vase,
 they are two of the most admired and influential vases from antiquity. The place of the Medici Vase in the Western canon of Greek and Roman remains may be gauged by its prominent position in the composed views or capricci that were a specialty of the Roman painter Giovanni Paolo Panini, to pick the outstanding example.<ref group="n">Panini's composed View of Roman Monuments, featuring the Medici Vase, at the Philadelphia Museum of Art is illustrated in Richard Paul Wunder, "Panini's View of Roman Monuments", Philadelphia Museum of Art Bulletin 56 (Winter  1961:54–56) p. 55; in the catalogue of the most influential Roman antiquities in Francis Haskell and Nicholas Penny, Taste and the Antique: The Lure of Classical Sculpture 1500–1900 (1981) the Medici Vase is cat. no. 82.</ref> Angelica Kauffman painted the second Lord Berwick on his Grand Tour seated beside the vase.

Many "copies", sometimes rather loose, were made to decorate palaces or their gardens.  The Medici Vase remains a popular subject for imitation in bronze or porcelain, for example by Wedgwood. Material on the many later decorative versions of the pairing can be found at Borghese Vase.

Copies

See also
Medici lions

Notes

References

Francis Haskell and Nicholas Penny, 1981. Taste and the Antique: the Lure of Classical Sculpture 1500–1900 (Yale University Press) 1981: cat. no. 82.

External links
Flickr: "Replica of Medici Vase in Kew Gardens" — photo''.
Mallettantiques.com: 19th century copy of the Medici Vase

Hellenistic and Roman sculptural vases
Medici
Hellenistic-style Roman sculptures
Classical sculptures in the Uffizi
History of sculpture
Agamemnon